The 65th Street Terminal station was a station on the demolished section of the BMT Fifth Avenue Line in Brooklyn, New York City. It was served by trains of the BMT Fifth Avenue Line, and despite the name of the line was actually located at Third Avenue and 65th Street. It had two tracks and one island platform. The station had connections to the Bay Ridge Suburban Line, Bay Ridge Line, Third Avenue Line, and 86th Street Suburban Line trolleys. Today, the western terminus of the Belt Parkway at the interchange with the Gowanus Expressway can be found in the vicinity.

History 
An extension of the Fifth Avenue Elevated, along Fifth Avenue, 38th Street, and Third Avenue, opened to 65th Street on October 1, 1893.

At midnight on June 1, 1940, service on the Fifth Avenue Elevated ended as required by the unification of the city's three subway companies.

On September 15, 1941, the demolition of the Fifth Avenue Elevated started at 35th Street and Fifth Avenue, and it was completed by November of that year. The section of the elevated on Third Avenue from 38th Street to 65th Street was used as part of the elevated highway approach, the Gowanus Expressway, to the Brooklyn–Battery Tunnel. In total, three miles of the elevated was scrapped, with the work being done by the Harris Structural Steel Company.

References

BMT Fifth Avenue Line stations
Railway stations in the United States opened in 1893
Railway stations closed in 1940
Former elevated and subway stations in Brooklyn
Sunset Park, Brooklyn